The 1978 Atlantic Coast Conference baseball tournament was held at Beautiful Tiger Field in Clemson, SC from April 20 through April 24.  won the tournament and earned the Atlantic Coast Conference's automatic bid to the 1978 NCAA Division I baseball tournament.

Tournament

See also
College World Series
NCAA Division I Baseball Championship

References

2007 ACC Baseball Media Guide

Tournament
Atlantic Coast Conference baseball tournament
Atlantic Coast Conference baseball tournament
Atlantic Coast Conference baseball tournament
College baseball tournaments in South Carolina
Sports competitions in Clemson, South Carolina